Otto, Duke of Brunswick-Lüneburg (24 August 1495 – 11 August 1549) was the Prince of Lüneburg from 1520 to 1527 and Baron of Harburg from 1527 to 1549.

Life 
Otto was born on 24 August 1495 as the eldest son of Henry the Middle and his wife, Margarete of Saxony. Like his brothers, Ernest and Francis he studied at Wittenberg and was affected early on by the reformatory ideas of Martin Luther and was later a driving force behind the introduction of the Reformation in the Principality of Lüneburg. When his father had to leave the state in 1520 as a result of his role in the Hildesheim Diocesan Feud and go into exile in France, Otto took over the reins of power in the principality jointly with his brother Ernest. Because the principality was seriously in debt - all the Vogteis being enfeoffed with the exception of the Schlossvogtei of Celle - a major priority during his reign was sorting out the duchy’s finances. In 1527 Otto married Meta von Campe, a woman who was below his station, and was compensated with his own domain, the Barony of Harburg. He died on 11 August 1549.

Family 
Otto married in 1527 to Meta von Campe (died 1580) and they had 7 children:
 Anne (1526–1527)
 Otto (1527)
 Ernest (1527–1540)
 Otto II (1528–1603)
 Frederick (1530–1533)
 Margarete (1532–1539)
 Susanna (1536–1581)

Ancestry

Sources 
 Geckler, Christa (1986). Die Celler Herzöge: Leben und Wirken 1371–1705. Celle: Georg Ströher. . .

External links 
 House of Welf

|-

Princes of Lüneburg
1495 births
1549 deaths
Converts to Lutheranism from Roman Catholicism
Middle House of Lüneburg